Asian literature is the literature produced in Asia.

Examples
East Asian literature
Chinese literature
Japanese literature
Korean literature
Mongolian literature
Taiwanese literature
South Asian literature
Indian literature
Pakistani literature
Bangladeshi folk literature
Sri Lankan literature
Bhutanese literature
Southeast Asian literature
Thai literature
Philippine literature
Malaysian literature
Indonesian literature
Burmese literature
Cambodian literature
Laotian literature
Singaporean literature
Vietnamese literature
Central Asian literature
Kazakh literature
Tajik literature 
Uzbek literature
Kyrgyz literature
West Asian literature
Persian literature
Arabic literature
Jewish literature
Turkish literature

Classical Indian literature

Classical Chinese and Japanese literature

In Tang and Song dynasty China, famous poets such as Li Bai authored works of great importance. They wrote shī (Classical Chinese: 詩) poems, which have lines with equal numbers of characters, as well as cí (詞) poems with mixed line varieties. Early-Modern Japanese literature (17th–19th centuries) developed comparable innovations such as haiku, a form of Japanese poetry that evolved from the ancient hokku (Japanese language: 発句) mode. Haiku consists of three sections (all in a single vertical line in Japanese): the first and third segments each have five morae (which are not the phonological equivalent of syllables), while the second has seven. Original haiku masters included such figures as Edo period poet Matsuo Bashō (松尾芭蕉); others influenced by Bashō include Kobayashi Issa and Masaoka Shiki.

Classical West Asian literature

Modern Asian literature
The polymath Rabindranath Tagore, a Bengali poet, dramatist, and writer who was an Indian, became in 1913 the first Asian Nobel laureate. He won his Nobel Prize in Literature for notable impact his prose works and poetic thought had on English, French, and other national literatures of Europe and the Americas. He also wrote the Indian anthem. Later, other Asian writers won Nobel Prizes in literature, including Yasunari Kawabata (Japan, 1966), and Kenzaburō Ōe (Japan, 1994). Yasunari Kawabata wrote novels
and short stories distinguished by their elegant and spartan diction such as the novels Snow Country and The Master of Go.

See also
 The Literature section of the article Culture of Asia
 The categories Literature by continent, Chinese literature, Korean literature, Indian literature, and Japanese literature.
 African literature
 European literature
 Oceanian literature
 Latin American literature